The black neon tetra (Hyphessobrycon herbertaxelrodi) is a freshwater fish of the characin family (Characidae) of the order Characiformes. It is native to the Paraguay basin of southern Brazil. They are often found in the aquarium trade.

Taxonomy
The species is named in honor of pet-book publisher Herbert R. Axelrod (1927-2017), whose Tropical Fish Hobbyist magazine published this description and several others by Géry.

Description

This species is of typical elongated tetra appearance; it is of plain basic
coloration, but with two distinct, adjacent, longitudinal stripes; white above
black. The eye has two thin but distinctive color bands across the top; red
above yellow. Befitting its common name, it slightly resembles the neon tetra, which belongs to the same genus (Hyphessobrycon)

The fish's natural diet consists of small invertebrates and plants.

H. herbertaxelrodi is commonly kept as an aquarium fish by hobbyists.

The black neon tetra is sometimes called the black tetra, but that name more
properly refers to a different species, Gymnocorymbus ternetzi.

In the aquarium

Black neon tetras are kept in soft acidic water, which should be kept clean at all times. Their tank should contain live plants, a darker substrate and open water for swimming. Black neon Tetras should be kept in groups of at least 6, preferably more.

The Black neon tetra requires the following aquarium conditions:

Recommended min. aquarium volume for a group of 6 is about 15 US gallons (60 L), and for a group of 8-10 fishes about 20 gallons.
pH 5 - 7 
dH (hardness) 1 - 2
Temperature 

These fish swim at the top level of the aquarium, and do not feed from the bottom of the tank. Therefore, it is recommended they be kept with bottom dwelling fish (such as pygmy corydoras) so that leftover food is then eaten up off the substrate and not left to waste.

Black neon tetras can be fed a variety of foods, including flake, frozen and freeze dried food. Small live foods like worms and brine shrimp are also recommended as they bring out the fish's colours.

Breeding
Black neon tetras can be spawned rather easily if the water quality is right. Before attempting to breed the black neon tetra, breeders condition the prospective parents with food. Fish around one year old can be suitable for breeding. The sex of the fish is determined by its body shape, the female being much deeper and more plump than the males.
Although the black neon tetra can be kept in water harder and more alkaline than its natural habitat, for breeding it is necessary to be closer to what it would feel like in the Amazon. Breeding the Black neon tetra requires acidic water with no more than four degrees of hardness.

The black neon tetra is an egg scatterer, laying adhesive (sticky) eggs over plants, etc. One female can produce several hundred eggs. The parents will eat their own eggs, so it is normal to remove the parents after spawning. As with many fish, The black neon tetra often spawns in the early morning.
Raising the fry can be more difficult because of their small size. The first food will normally be protozoa (infusoria), then Daphnia. Very fine fry food can be used, graduating to slightly coarse fry food. At all ages, the black neon tetra benefits from suitably sized live food.

See also
List of freshwater aquarium fish species

References

 
 

Fish described in 1961
Taxa named by Jacques Géry
Fishkeeping
Tetras